NGC 3857 is a lenticular galaxy located about 295 million light-years away in the constellation Leo. The galaxy was discovered by astronomer by Édouard Stephan on March 23, 1884. It is a member of the Leo Cluster.

See also
 List of NGC objects (3001–4000)

References

External links
 

3857
36548
Leo (constellation)
Leo Cluster
Lenticular galaxies
Astronomical objects discovered in 1884
Discoveries by Édouard Stephan